David Joseph Toscano (born June 28, 1950) is an American politician and lawyer.

Career 
A Democrat, he served on the Charlottesville, Virginia city council from 1990 to 2002 and was mayor from 1994 to 1996. In November 2005 he was elected to the Virginia House of Delegates, succeeding Mitchell Van Yahres. He represented the 57th district, made up of the city of Charlottesville and part of Albemarle County. Toscano served as House Minority Leader from 2011-2018.

Electoral history 
Toscano first won the Democratic nomination for the District 57 House of Delegates seat in 2005.

Toscano only faced a general election opponent three times: in 2005, against Republican, T. W. McCrystal; and in 2009 and 2011 against Independent candidate, Robert Brandon Smith III.

In 2011, Toscano was elected Minority leader in the House of Delegates.

Toscano did not seek reelection in the 2019 election, while facing an already declared challenge in the Democratic Party primary from Sally L. Hudson, who ultimately won the primary and the general election to succeed him in that seat.

References

External links
 (constituent/campaign website)

1950 births
20th-century American politicians
21st-century American politicians
Boston College alumni
Colgate University alumni
Lawyers from Syracuse, New York
Living people
Mayors of Charlottesville, Virginia
Democratic Party members of the Virginia House of Delegates
Politicians from Syracuse, New York
University of Virginia School of Law alumni
Virginia city council members
Virginia lawyers